Pierre-Joseph Charrin (2 February 1784 – 25 April 1863) was a 19th-century French poet, chansonnier, playwright and goguettier.

He was a member of the Caveau moderne and founder, in 1813, of the Soupers de Momus.

14 August 1814, he was received in the Caveau lyonnais. 
On that occasion he wrote reception couplets.

In 1815, in collaboration with César de Proisy d'Eppe, Alexis Eymery, René Perrin and Joseph Tastu, he was one of the five editors of the  Dictionnaire des girouettes, ou Nos contemporains peints d'après eux-mêmes ... par une société de girouettes... This 444 pages book which stigmatized the opportunists of the period 1789-1815, including illustrious members of the Caveau moderne such as Pierre-Antoine-Augustin de Piis and Emmanuel Dupaty, contributed to the demise of that society in 1817.

Selected works 
Poetry
1808: Le Cimetière de village ; Tobie, ou les Captifs de Ninive ; mes Loisirs
1817: le Passe-temps 
1825: Album poétique.

Theatre

Songs 
1816: L'Enfant lyrique du Carnaval, published by Ourry, includes the song Les Amours d'un jeune Tambour. It was wrongly attributed to M. Delorme.
1817: Les Passe-Tems d'un momusien, ou Chansons et poésies by P.-J. Charrin
1817: Les soirées de famille. Tome 1, contes, nouvelles, traits historiques et anecdotes ; recueil philosophique, moral et divertissant 
  Les Passe-Tems d'un momusien, ou Chansons et poésies de P.-J. Charrin, Membre de plusieurs Académies, Convive des soupers de Momus, etc. Ornés de 4 Gravures et de 8 Airs notés. Locard et Davi éditeurs, Paris 1817, 201 pages.
 The collection by Théophile-Marion Dumersan and Noël Ségur, Chansons nationales et populaires de France précédées d'une Histoire de la chanson française et accompagnées de notes historiques et littéraires , 17th edition, reworked ans augmented, Garnier frères éditeur, Paris 1866, contains 12 songs by Pierre-Joseph Charrin.

See also 
 Goguette

References

Sources 
 La Muse gauloise. Journal de la chanson par tous et pour tous., numéro 8, 15 juin 1863.

External links 
 Pierre Joseph Charrin on data.bnf.fr 

19th-century French poets
19th-century French dramatists and playwrights
French chansonniers
Chevaliers of the Légion d'honneur
1784 births
Writers from Lyon
1863 deaths